List of military units raised by the state of Vermont during the American Civil War.

Artillery

Cavalry

 1st Vermont Volunteer Cavalry Regiment
 Frontier Cavalry (26th New York Cavalry)

Infantry

Brigades
1st Vermont Brigade
2nd Vermont Brigade

See also
 Vermont in the American Civil War
 Lists of American Civil War Regiments by State

 
Vermont
Civil War